El Revoltoso ("The Troublemaker") is a 1951 Mexican film directed by Gilberto Martinez Solares. The main character is played by the Mexican comedian Germán Valdés, better known as Tin-Tan. The plot revolves around a well-intentioned person who always creates trouble for other people, sometimes on purpose and sometimes by accident. Tin Tan is of humble origins and his job is shining shoes. He has a girlfriend who is also poor. After many adventures, Tin Tan finally makes enough money and is able to marry Lupita.

References

External links 
 

1951 films
1950s Spanish-language films
Mexican comedy films
1951 comedy films
Mexican black-and-white films
1950s Mexican films